Maxime, McDuff & McDo is a 2002 documentary film by Magnus Isacsson that shows the attempt to unionize a McDonald's restaurant in Montreal, Quebec, Canada. They were successful, but McDonald's quickly shut down the franchise after the union won.

See also 
McLibel case
McJob
Fast Food Nation (film)

References

External links 

2002 films
Canadian documentary films
Anti-corporate activism
Labour relations in Canada
Documentary films about the labor movement
Documentary films about Montreal
Quebec films
Criticism of fast food
2002 documentary films
Documentary films about McDonald's
French-language Canadian films
2000s English-language films
2000s Canadian films